is a railway station in Kirishima, Kagoshima, Japan.

Lines

Layout 
The station consists of a side and an island platform serving three tracks at grade. A passing loop and two sidings branch off track 3 to the southeast. The station building, located on the northwest side of the tracks, is a modern concrete structure with bamboo trim which houses a waiting area, automatic ticket vending machines and staffed ticket window. Access to the island platform is by means of a footbridge.

Management of the passenger facilities at the station has been outsourced to the JR Kyushu Tetsudou Eigyou Co., a wholly owned subsidiary of JR Kyushu specialising in station services. It staffs the ticket booth which is equipped with a Midori no Madoguchi facility.

Platforms

Adjacent stations

History
The entire stretch of track from Mojikō through Yatsushiro, Kokubu to Kagoshima was redesignated as the Kagoshima Main Line on 21 November 1909.

By 1927, another track from Yatsushiro through  to Kagoshima had been built and this was now designated as part of the Kagoshima Main Line. The track from Yatsushiro through Kokubu to Kagoshima was thus redesignated as the Hisatsu Line on 17 October 1927.

On 1 September 1929, the station was renamed Nishi-Kokubu. On 15 September 1930, Nishi-Kokubu was renamed to Hayato. On 6 December 1932, the entire stretch of track from Kokura through Hayato to Kagoshima was redesignated as the Nippō Main Line. At the same time, Hayato became the southern terminus of the Hisatsu Line. With the privatization of Japanese National Railways (JNR), the successor of JGR, on 1 April 1987, the station came under the control of JR Kyushu.

Passenger statistics
In fiscal 2016, the station was used by an average of 1,641 passengers daily (boarding passengers only), and it ranked 109th among the busiest stations of JR Kyushu.

Surrounding area
 Hayato Post office
 Kirishima City Hall Hayato Branch
 Kagoshima Shrine

See also
 List of railway stations in Japan

References

External links

Hayato (JR Kyushu)

Stations of Kyushu Railway Company
Railway stations in Kagoshima Prefecture
Railway stations in Japan opened in 1901